"I Want Candy" is a song written and originally recorded by the Strangeloves in 1965 that reached No. 11 on the US Billboard Hot 100 chart. It is a famous example of a song that uses the Bo Diddley beat.

Original version
"I Want Candy" was written by Bert Berns, Bob Feldman, Jerry Goldstein and Richard Gottehrer in 1965. Some reports suggest that the song was written after the producers saw dancer Candy Johnson performing at the 1964 World's Fair.

As writers/producers, Feldman, Goldstein and Gottehrer had already scored big hits for other artists, including "My Boyfriend's Back" by the Angels. For this song, the trio took on the moniker of the Strangeloves, and recorded the tune themselves, augmented by studio musicians (co-writer Berns was not involved in the studio recording).  The female vocalist heard half-screaming, half-singing "Baby!" in the middle of the track was an unknown session singer.

Although Feldman, Goldstein and Gottehrer used their real names in the writing and production credits of this single, they claimed the Strangeloves were actually three Australian brothers (and ex-sheep farmers) named Giles, Miles and Niles Strange. Feldman, Goldstein and Gottehrer dressed up in shaggy wigs and exotic clothing for publicity photos as the Strangeloves.

"I Want Candy", the Strangeloves' second single, reached No. 7 in Canada and hit No. 11 in the US. The record failed to chart in the UK—or in the Strangeloves' so-called "native" country, Australia.

The Tremeloes version
In the UK, the song first hit the UK Singles Chart in 1965, in a version by beat group Brian Poole and the Tremeloes, who took it to No. 25. This version also peaked at No. 81 in Australia.

Bow Wow Wow version

English new wave group Bow Wow Wow released their version as the first and only single from their EP The Last of the Mohicans. It was a top 10 hit in their native United Kingdom. For many in America, "I Want Candy" was their first introduction to young lead singer Annabella Lwin and the band, who partnered with producer Kenny Laguna to record the song at Criteria Studios in Miami, Florida. The song barely scraped the top 60 there but became an enduring new wave classic.

To capitalize on the success of the "I Want Candy" music video, RCA compiled an album called I Want Candy for their newfound American audience. The album peaked at No. 123 on the Billboard 200.

The Bow Wow Wow recording appeared on two VH1 countdowns:
No. 86 on VH1's "100 Greatest Songs of the '80s"
No. 8 on VH1's "100 Greatest One Hit Wonders of the '80s"

Charts

Candy Girls version

British duo Candy Girls, consisting of Rachel Auburn and Paul Masterson, released a cover of "I Want Candy" featuring singer Valerie Malcolm. It became their third hit single in 1996, peaking at No. 30 on the UK Singles Chart and No. 12 on the UK Dance Singles Chart. On Music Weeks UK on a Pop Tip Club Chart, the song hit number-one. The single was their last as the duo split after the release. Masterson went on to have hits as Amen! UK, Clergy, Yomanda, Dorothy and Hi-Gate. A music video was also produced to promote the single.

Critical reception
A reviewer from Music Week rated Candy Girls' version of "I Want Candy" three out of five, describing it as "a pumped-up version of Bow Wow Wow's hit complete with piano breaks for that hands in the air bit. The girls' debut could catapult them chartwards." Daisy & Havoc from the magazine's RM Dance Update gave it four out of five, writing, "The next booming Candy Girls outing is probably their best yet. It's really amusing, with the so-suitable 'I want candy' vocal and the all-round Nineties pop meets Fifties kitsch feel, and it's positively rabble-rousing in its enormous piano breaks."

Track listings
 Disc 1
"I Want Candy" (Radio Edit)
"I Want Candy" (12" Mix)
"I Want Candy" (Candy's Disco Dub)
"I Want Candy" (Jon the Dentist's Mix)
"I Want Candy" (Beat Barons Mix)

Disc 2
"I Want Candy" (Radio Edit)
"Wham Bam"
"Fee Fi Fo Fum"

Charts

Aaron Carter version

Aaron Carter released a cover of "I Want Candy" as his seventh overall single, and the second single from his second album, Aaron's Party (Come Get It) (2000).

This version of "I Want Candy" begins with a phone conversation with a friend about a girl named Candy and features the participation of his brother Nick Carter from the Backstreet Boys. Carter promoted it by performing it on the show Lizzie McGuire. A music video was produced to promote the single, directed by Andrew MacNaughtan. Carter released a remix of the song in 2018, self-produced on his LøVë album.

The music video for this version features Carter going on a date with Candy while three boys constantly harass him.

Track listings
Single
"I Want Candy" (album version) – 3:13
"I Want Candy" (instrumental) – 3:13

Maxi CD
"I Want Candy" (album version) – 3:13
"I Want Candy" (instrumental) – 3:13
"Jump Jump" – 2:39

Charts

Year-end charts

Melanie C version

"I Want Candy" was the second single to be taken from Melanie C's fourth album This Time, in the UK, Denmark and Italy. The song was also the soundtrack to the movie of the same name, and the video featured Melanie dancing for the first time since the Spice Girls. Melanie split her time between the UK and Europe, where she was promoting "The Moment You Believe", and as a result, the single was not heavily promoted and reached No. 24 — although on the physical chart, the single reached No. 7. "I Want Candy" went on to sell 12,510 copies in the UK, but had better success in Italy (No. 9) and Denmark (No. 12).

Melanie premiered her version of the song during Al Murray's Happy Hour on ITV1 on 24 February 2007. The video was premiered on 2 March 2007 in the UK. The song was released as Italy's and Denmark's first single from the new album, where it reached No. 9 in both countries, while in other European countries, the ballad "The Moment You Believe" was chosen.

Music video
In the video for "I Want Candy", Melanie C is featured in a skin-tight catsuit, featuring a sexually suggestive dance routine with half-naked bodybuilders in crowd-controller uniforms. The video instantly grabbed the No. 1 spot on YouTube with 200,000 hits in its first day.

Formats and track listings
These are the formats and track listings of major single releases of "I Want Candy" by Melanie C.

UK 7" vinyl single
"I Want Candy"
"Already Gone"

UK Maxi CD single
"I Want Candy"  – 3:23
"I Want Candy"  – 6:37
"I Want Candy"  – 5:16
"I Want Candy"  – 7:33
"I Want Candy"  – 3:22

Italian Maxi CD single
"I Want Candy"  – 3:23
"I Want Candy"  – 6:37
"I Want Candy"  – 5:16
"I Want Candy"  – 7:33
"Already Gone" – 4:12
"I Want Candy"  – 3:22

Charts

References

1965 songs
1965 singles
1982 singles
1996 singles
2000 singles
2007 singles
Aaron Carter songs
Bow Wow Wow songs
Melanie C songs
The Tremeloes songs
Music videos directed by Andrew MacNaughtan
Song recordings produced by Stephen Hague
Songs written by Bert Berns
Songs written by Jerry Goldstein (producer)
Songs written by Richard Gottehrer
Bang Records singles
RCA Records singles
Jive Records singles
EMI Records singles
Songs written by Bob Feldman